Vladimir Țaranu (born 27 June 1982 in Moldova) is a Moldovan footballer who last played as a forward for Iskra-Stal.

In February 2009 Țaranu rejoined the Azerbaijan Premier League, signing for Mughan for the remainder of the seasons, and was the clubs joint top goalscorer that season with Farid Guliyev on 4 goals.

Career statistics

Honours 
 Moldovan Cup: 2010–11

References

External links
Footballdatabase profile

Moldava Sports Profile

1982 births
Living people
Moldovan footballers
Gabala FC players
Association football forwards
Expatriate footballers in Azerbaijan
FK Mughan players
FC Iskra-Stal players
FC Nistru Otaci players